Mohammed Hassan Salama is a Free Syrian Army lieutenant colonel, who defected from the Syrian Army to the FSA. He is the commander of the Dawn of Islam Division since late February 2013. His group received U.S.-made BGM-71 TOW anti-tank missile.

References

Living people
Year of birth missing (living people)
Syrian colonels